Straneotia amazonica, the Amazon slim arboreal carabid, is a species of beetle in the family Carabidae. It is found in western Amazon Basin.

They are macropterous and capable of flight.

References

Lebiinae
Beetles described in 1961